Sand is the fifth studio album by guitarist Allan Holdsworth, released in 1987 through Relativity Records (United States) and JMS–Cream Records (Europe).

Critical reception

Thom Jurek of AllMusic awarded Sand four stars out of five, calling it one of Holdsworth's "most innovative and texturally beautiful" albums to date and highlighting his extensive use of the SynthAxe.

Track listing

Personnel
Allan Holdsworth – guitar, SynthAxe, engineering, mixing, production
Alan Pasqua – keyboard
Gary Husband – drums (tracks 1, 3)
Chad Wackerman – drums (tracks 4, 5), percussion (track 6)
Jimmy Johnson – bass (except track 6)
Biff Vincent – Roland Octapad bass (track 6)
John England – sound effects

Technical
Dan Humann – engineering, mixing
Robert Feist – engineering, mixing
Bernie Grundman – mastering
Francois Bardol – cover art

References

External links
Sand at therealallanholdsworth.com (archived)
Allan Holdsworth "Sand" at Guitar Nine

Allan Holdsworth albums
1987 albums
Relativity Records albums